Vibratory angioedema is a form of physical urticaria that may be an inherited autosomal dominant trait, or may be acquired after prolonged exposure to occupational vibration.

See also
 Urticaria
 Skin lesion
 List of cutaneous conditions

References

 

Urticaria and angioedema